The discography of Japanese pop singer Kana Nishino consists of seven studio albums, six compilation albums, thirty-four singles and ten video albums. 
Nishino debuted in 2008 under Sony Music Japan, and gained national recognition with the singles "Tōkutemo" and "Kimi ni Aitaku Naru Kara" (2009). Nishino has released some of the most digitally successful songs in Japan: "Motto..." (2009), "Dear..." (2009), "Best Friend" (2010), "Aitakute Aitakute" (2010), "If" (2010) and "Kimi tte" (2010), all of which were certified million by the RIAJ.

Nishino Kana has scored six number-one albums. She also had numerous chart-topping hits on the digital charts, establishing herself as an admirable force on the digital music charts of her native country. Her digital sales to date has reached over 46,000,000 downloads, making her one of the most successful female artists in digital chart history. Nishino has sold over 5,000,000 physical records (singles included).

Studio albums

Compilation albums

Singles

As a lead artist

As a collaborating artist

Promotional singles

Other charted songs

Other appearances

Video albums

Notes

References

Discographies of Japanese artists
Pop music discographies